Thekkumbhagam or Thekkumbhagom is the southern border town of Paravur municipality in the Kollam district of Kerala, India.  It is located at the Southern tip of Kollam's coastal area. It is in the Arabian Sea coast. Thekkumbhagam-Kappil estuary point in the Kollam-Thiruvananthapuram coastal border is one of the emerging tourism spots in the state. On 1936, during formation, Thekkumbhagam was one of the 9 territories of Paravur Panchayath. Thekkumbhagam estuary is one among the twin estuary points in Paravur. The other one is Pozhikara estuary.

Thekkumbhagam is a famous shooting spot now. Few shots of Aamir Khan's latest Laal Singh Chaddha done at Thekkumbhagam during December 2019.

Estuary in Paravur Thekkumbhagam

Paravur landmass' 3 sides are surrounded by water bodies - Paravur Lake, Nadayara Lake and Arabian Sea. Both north and south tips of Paravur town is having peninsula and estuary. Thekkumbhagam is at south of Paravur. Thekkumbhagam estuary is the most crowd-pulling estuary in the state. It is located at the borders of Kollam-Thiruvananthapuram districts. A beach in this location attracts crowds every day. The estuary can be accessed by travelling through Paravur-Kappil-Varkala road.

Places of interest near Thekkumbhagam
 Paravur - The temple town of Kollam
 Puthenpalli Jumua Masjid- one of the oldest masjids in south Kerala(750 years old masjid)
 Pudiyidam Mahadeva Temple.                                        
 Thekkumbhagam-Kappil beach and estuary
 Priyadarshini Boat Club
 Paravur Lake
 Pozhikara estuary
 Polachira wetlands
 Puthenkulam Elephant Village

See also
 Paravur
 Pozhikkara
 Nedungolam
 Paravur Kayal
 Paravur railway station

Gallery

References

Neighbourhoods in Paravur
Estuaries of India
Beaches of Kollam district
Tourist attractions in Kollam district